Indian Guides or variant may refer to:
 a guide for the bush, or from a native population

Military
 Corps of Guides (India)

Children's Guiding
 YMCA Indian Guides, the former name of Adventure Guides, an outdoor youth program
 a girl guide/scout in/from India, see Scouting and Guiding in India
 a girl guide/scout who is American Indian, see American Indian Scouting Association

Other
 the 1927 Indian Guide Monument, a monument in Peabody, Kansas, USA

See also
 Indian (disambiguation)
 Guide (disambiguation)
 Indian scout (disambiguation)